The 2019–20 CSA Provincial One-Day Challenge was a domestic one-day cricket tournament that took place in South Africa from October to March 2020. The tournament was played in parallel with the 2019–20 CSA 3-Day Provincial Cup, a first-class competition which featured the same teams. On 16 March 2020, Cricket South Africa suspended all cricket in the country for 60 days due to the COVID-19 pandemic. On 24 March 2020, Free State and Northern Cape were named as the joint-winners of the tournament, after finishing top of Groups A and B respectively. This was following the recommendations made by Graeme Smith, the acting Director of Cricket.

The competition was played between the thirteen South African provincial teams. In previous editions of the competition, Namibia had also competed, but they withdrew ahead of the start of the previous tournament, citing issues around costs and logistics. Easterns were the defending champions.

Points table

Pool A

Pool B

Fixtures

October 2019

November 2019

December 2019

January 2020

February 2020

March 2020

Final

References

External links
 Series home at ESPN Cricinfo

South African domestic cricket competitions
CSA Provincial One-Day Challenge
2019–20 South African cricket season
CSA Provincial One-Day Challenge
CSA Provincial One-Day Challenge